Nan-e Shekari is the name of a type of sweet that is prepared in the city of Kermanshah and is known as one of the souvenirs of this city. This sweet is so called because of the use of sugar to decorate it. The best type of Nan-e Shekari is baked with Kermanshahi oil.

Recipes 
Eggs, flour, sugar powder, Kermanshahi oil or butter, brewed saffron, vanilla and cardamom are used to prepare the dough for this sweet. Sugar is also used to decorate sweets, which is why it is called "Nan-e Shekari" which means sugar bread. Confectionery workshops in Kermanshah bake Nan-e Shekari in the oven.

References 

Iranian cuisine
Fried foods
Iranian breads